Fentress County is a county located in the U.S. state of Tennessee. As of the 2020 census, the population was 18,489. Its county seat is Jamestown.

History

Fentress County was formed on November 28, 1823, from portions of Morgan, Overton and White counties. The resulting county was named for James Fentress (1763–1843), who served as speaker of the state house, chairman of Montgomery County Court, and commissioner to select seats for Haywood, Carroll, Gibson and Weakley counties in West Tennessee.

Fentress County was the site of several saltpeter mines. Saltpeter is the main ingredient of gunpowder and was obtained by leaching the earth from local caves. The largest mine was in York Cave, near the Wolf River Post Office. At one time, twenty-five  large leaching vats were in operation in this cave.  According to Barr (1961) this cave was mined during the Civil War. Buffalo Cave near Jamestown was also a major mine with twelve leaching vats. Manson Saltpeter Cave in Big Indian Creek Valley was a smaller operation with four leaching vats. These caves may also have been mined during the War of 1812, as saltpeter mining was widespread in Kentucky and Tennessee during that era.

In the runup to the American Civil War, when Tennessee Governor Harris asked the State Legislature for a vote of secession, the two representatives from Fentress County (Reese T. Hildreth and R. H. Bledsoe) voted for Secession.

Alvin York (1887–1964), a hero at the Meuse-Argonne Offensive during World War I, was born and lived in Fentress County. He established the Alvin C. York Agricultural Institute in Jamestown in 1924. York's house and farm are part of Sgt. Alvin C. York State Historic Park in Pall Mall.

County Officials
County Executive: Jimmy Johnson 
County Sheriff: Michael Reagon 
County Register of Deeds: Trish Slaven
County Road Supervisor: Joey Reagan
County Property Assessor: Melynda Sullivan
County Trustee: Angie Sweet
Circuit Court Clerk: Gina Miller
County Clerk: Marylin Stephens
County Emergency Management Director: James Bilbrey
County 911 Director: Richard Cross
County Fire Chief: Scott King
County Emergency Services Director: Micah Dunford
County Finance Director: Tyler Arms
Clerk and Master: Linda Smith
Election Commission Director: Joey Williams
General Sessions Judge: Todd Burnett
Solid Waste Director: Michael Rick
Library Director: Donna Conatser

Geography

Fentress County includes part of Dale Hollow Reservoir and is drained by forks of the Obey and Cumberland Rivers.

The county is the easternmost county in the United States to observe Central Time.

Adjacent counties

Pickett County (north)
Scott County (east/EST Border)
Morgan County (southeast/EST Border)
Cumberland County (south)
Overton County (west)
Putnam County (southwest)

National protected area
 Big South Fork National River and Recreation Area (part)

State protected areas
 Catoosa Wildlife Management Area (part)
 Colditz Cove State Natural Area
 Pickett State Forest (part)
 Pogue Creek Canyon State Natural Area
 Scott State Forest (part)
 Sgt. Alvin C. York State Historic Park
 Skinner Mountain Wildlife Management Area
 Twin Arches State Natural Area (part)

Demographics

2020 census

As of the 2020 United States census, there were 18,489 people, 7,443 households, and 4,929 families residing in the county.

2010 census
As of the 2010 census, there were 17,959 people, 7,326 households, and 4,818 families residing in the county. The population density was 36 people per square mile (13/km2). There were 8,927 housing units at an average density of 15 per square mile (6/km2). The racial makeup of the county was 98.1% White, 0.2% Black or African American, 0.2% Native American, 0.2% Asian, 0.4% from other races, and 0.9% from two or more races. 1.1% of the population were Hispanic or Latino of any race.

In the county's 7,326 households, 23.1% had children under the age of 18, 57.30% were married couples living together, 11.30% had a female householder with no husband present, and 28.00% were non-families. 25.50% of all households were made up of individuals, and 11.10% had someone living alone who was 65 years of age or older. The average household size was 2.46 and the average family size was 2.94.

In the county, the population was spread out, with 24.20% under the age of 18, 8.00% from 18 to 24, 28.10% from 25 to 44, 26.10% from 45 to 64, and 13.70% who were 65 years of age or older. The median age was 38 years. For every 100 females there were 96.20 males. For every 100 females age 18 and over, there were 93.10 males.

The median income for a household in the county was $23,238, and the median income for a family was $28,856. Males had a median income of $23,606 versus $18,729 for females. The per capita income for the county was $12,999. 19.50% of families and 23.10% of the population were below the poverty line, including 27.80% of those under age 18 and 20.50% of those over age 64.

Communities

Cities
Allardt
Jamestown

Census-designated places
Clarkrange
Grimsley

Unincorporated communities

Armathwaite
Banner Springs
Forbus
Pall Mall
 Sharp Place
Wilder
Zenith

Politics
Fentress County has been heavily Republican since the Civil War. Since then, only two Democrats, Southerners Jimmy Carter in 1976 and Bill Clinton in 1992 and 1996 have carried Fentress County. Since 2000, the county has shifted further and further to the right.

See also
National Register of Historic Places listings in Fentress County, Tennessee

References

Further reading
Duke, Jason. Tennessee Coal Mining, Railroading & Logging in Cumberland, Fentress, Overton & Putnam. Nashville: Turner Publishing (2004). 
Hogue, Albert R. History of Fentress County, Tennessee. Santa Maria: Janaway Publishing (2010). 
Hogue, Albert R. History of Fentress County, Tennessee; The Old Home of Mark Twain's Ancestors. Memphis: General Books (2010).

External links

 
 Fentress County Chamber of Commerce
 Fentress County Schools
 Fentress County, TNGenWeb – genealogy resources 
 Fentress County Landforms
 

 
1823 establishments in Tennessee
Middle Tennessee
Counties of Appalachia
Populated places established in 1823